1/2 Gentlemen/Not Beasts is the debut album by American rock band Half Japanese.  Originally released in 1980 by Armageddon Records as a triple record, it was re-released in 1992 on CD on T.E.C. Tones with additional material. Fire Records reissued it again in 2013 on three-CD and four-LP sets on Record Store Day 2013 with further additional material, limited to 1,000 copies in each format.

Style
The music has a sound more raw than garage rock, and has a very low fidelity recording. Most of the songs are originals with covers of a few of the band's influences interspersed. Most tracks are very loud and have an almost no wave sound, though some tracks are very meditative Krautrock-influenced instrumentals.

Legacy
Half Japanese have since played with many important artists of the experimental or alternative persuasion, such as Sonic Youth and Nirvana. Daniel Johnston has made a record with Half Japanese's vocalist, Jad Fair.

Track listing

Personnel 
Half Japanese
 Jad Fair – vocals, guitar, drums, illustrations
 David Fair – vocals, guitar, drums
 John Dreyfuss – saxophone
 Rick Dreyfuss – drums

References 

1980 debut albums
Half Japanese albums
Fire Records (UK) albums